Ethylidene norbornene (ENB) is an organic compound that consists of an ethylidene (CH3C(H)=) group attached to norbornene.  It is a colorless liquid.  The molecule consists of two sites of unsaturation. The compound consists of E- and Z-stereoisomers, but the mixtures are typically not separated.

Preparation and use
It is prepared by isomerization of vinyl norbornene, which in turn is obtained by the Diels-Alder reaction of butadiene and cyclopentadiene.  

It is a monomer that used in the production of the commercial polymer EPDM.  Only the ring alkene participates in the copolymerization. Tthe exocyclic double bond (the ethylidene group) undergoes sulfur vulcanization.

Safety
Its  (intravenous, rabbit) ranges from 0.09 (male rabbit) to 0.11 ml/kg (female).  It is also a neurotoxin.

References

Cyclopentenes
Monomers